State Route 49 (SR 49) is a state highway in the western part of the U.S. state of Ohio.  It begins in Drexel, an area within the city of Trotwood, at US 35 and runs northwesterly to Greenville, and then runs roughly along near the western edge of the state near the Indiana state line to the Michigan state line where it meets with Michigan's M-49.

Route description

SR 49's southern terminus is west of Dayton, at the intersection of U.S. Route 35 and West Third Street in Drexel. Both Drexel (a census-designated place) and the intersection straddle the border between Trotwood and Montgomery County's Jefferson Township. The roadway carrying SR 49 continues southward (signed "east") from this intersection as US 35 (designated "C. J. McLin Jr. Parkway"), a limited-access expressway into downtown Dayton. (Westbound US 35 proceeds along West Third Street)

SR 49 continues north from US 35 through Trotwood along a roadway locally called the "Northwest Connector" or the "Trotwood Connector", then turns onto Salem Avenue, which crosses into Clayton. The route then briefly travels through Englewood, straddles the Englewood-Clayton line, again crosses into Clayton, then the ramps to and from Interstate 70 cross into Englewood and back into Clayton. SR 49 is then concurrent with I-70 for approximately  through Clayton. SR 49 then exits from I-70 at ramps passing from Clayton into Clay Township, Montgomery County. The route then continues north to Greenville, Fort Recovery, Willshire, Convoy, Payne, Antwerp, Hicksville, Edgerton and Edon. SR 49 then interchanges with the Ohio Turnpike at that highway's first interchange east of the Indiana-Ohio state line. SR 49 terminates at the Ohio-Michigan state line where it continues north as Michigan State Highway 49.

A portion of SR 49 in Montgomery County has been designated the "Joseph G. LaPointe Jr. Memorial Highway", in honor of the United States Army medic who posthumously received the Medal of Honor for his actions during the Vietnam War.

History
SR 49 was first designated along its current route between US 30 in Van Wert County and the Michigan state line in 1927 having replaced a discontinuous section of SR 51. All of SR 51 was then renumbered to SR 49 in 1935 extending the route from downtown Dayton to Michigan. No major changes would occur to the routing until around 1960 when a part of SR 49 was rerouted on a new expressway segment of US 40 south and west of Clayton (now partly I-70) and the route through southern Darke County was straightened to bypass Arcanum. The old routing through Arcanum became SR 49 Alternate.

The most recent change to SR 49 occurred in the 1990s. Before 1999, SR 49 began in downtown Dayton at SR 4 and SR 48. It traveled west along First Street and Monument Avenue, crossing under I-75, and over the Great Miami River. The eastbound and westbound directions merged at the intersection of Salem and Riverview avenues before it traveled northwest out of the city on Salem Avenue. A new four-lane highway through Trotwood was partially completed in 1994 between Free Pike and Salem Avenue with the new road being designated SR 49 Future. By 1999, the new highway between US 35 and Salem Avenue was complete and SR 49 was rerouted out of Dayton to run on this new road. The old route to Dayton was designated SR 49-J indicating that it was being prepared for abandonment. The old segment of SR 49 along Salem Avenue was finally deleted from the state highway system in the summer of 2004.

Major intersections

SR 49 Alternate

State Route 49 Alternate (SR 49 Alt., officially designated SR 49A) is a  alternate route to SR 49 in southern Darke County. The route travels in an L-shape, and serves the community of Arcanum.

SR 49 Alt. was established in 1962.  Prior to this year, mainline SR 49 followed the entirety of SR 49 Alt. through Arcanum.  In 1962, SR 49 was re-routed onto the more linear alignment that it utilizes today to the northeast of Arcanum between the endpoints of SR 49 Alt. Consequently, the SR 49 Alt. designation was applied to this former mainline alignment of SR 49.

Major intersections

References

External links

049
Transportation in Montgomery County, Ohio
Transportation in Miami County, Ohio
Transportation in Darke County, Ohio
Transportation in Mercer County, Ohio
Transportation in Van Wert County, Ohio
Transportation in Paulding County, Ohio
Transportation in Defiance County, Ohio
Transportation in Williams County, Ohio